Hello Down There (rereleased in 1974 as Sub-A-Dub-Dub) is a 1969 American comedy-adventure film starring Tony Randall and Janet Leigh that was released by Paramount Pictures. It was produced by George Sherman and Ivan Tors and directed by Jack Arnold and Ricou Browning (underwater sequences). The screenplay was written by John McGreevey and Frank Telford.

Plot
Fred Miller must prove that his new design for an underwater home is viable by convincing his family to live in it for 30 days. His son and daughter are members of an emerging rock band, and they invite the two other band members to live with them during the experiment. Their temporary home, which Miller dubs the "Green Onion," is 90 feet below the surface of the ocean and is filled with modern appliances and amenities for housewife Vivian, all designed by Miller. A large opening in the floor provides direct access to and from the sea.

The group are soon joined by a live-in seal named Gladys and a pair of dolphins that stay close at hand and fend off sharks. The family is confronted by many obstacles, including a rival designer from Undersea Development, Inc. who begins to cause problems.

Meanwhile, the band's single has gotten the attention of record executive Nate Ashbury, who wants to sign them. He books them for a televised performance on The Merv Griffin Show without first communicating with them. After learning that they are living under the sea, he schemes to bring Griffin and the TV crew down to the Green Onion, but the navy is alerted to the sound of the music and becomes suspicious.

Cast
 Tony Randall as Fred Miller
 Janet Leigh as Vivian Miller
 Jim Backus as T.R. Hollister
 Ken Berry as Mel Cheever
 Roddy McDowall as Nate Ashbury
 Charlotte Rae as Myrtle Ruth
 Richard Dreyfuss as Harold Webster
 Kay Cole as Lorrie Miller
 Gary Tigerman as Tommie Miller
 Lou Wagner as Marvin Webster
 Bruce Gordon as Adm. Sheridan
 Lee Meredith as Dr Wells
 Frank Schuller as Alan Briggs
 Arnold Stang as Jonah
 Harvey Lembeck as Sonarman
 Merv Griffin as Himself
 Henny Backus as Mrs. Webster
 Pat Henning as Reilly
 Jay Laskay as Philo
 Bud Hoey as Mr. Webster
 Charles Martin as Chief Petty Officer
 Frank Logan as Captain
 Andy Jarrell as Radioman
 Lora Kaye as Secretary

Production
Hello Down There was filmed from October to December 1967, with interior scenes shot at Ivan Tors Studios (now known as Greenwich Studios) in Miami, Florida. The underwater sequences were photographed at Ivan Tors Underwater Studios in The Bahamas.

The film's 1974 re-release was part of the "Paramount Family Matinee" series.

Reception 
In a contemporary review for The New York Times, critic A.H. Weiler called the film an "amiable mishmash" and wrote: "Mr. Randall, looking woebegone and harried, berates his nervous spouse: 'You can't ignore 71 per cent of the earth's surface simply because it's under water.' In the case of 'Hello Down There', it should definitely be ignored."

A Daily News review was also lukewarm, calling Hello Down There a "typical, routine family comedy for general audiences" while praising the underwater photography as well as the seal and dolphins "... who seem to act more sensibly than the adults."

Music soundtrack
The film features the following songs:

Home media
Hello Down There was released on February 22, 2005 as a Region 1 DVD by Paramount Pictures. The film was made available again on June 25, 2013 as a manufactured-on-demand DVD-R through the online Warner Bros. Archive Collection.

See also
 List of American films of 1969

References

External links
 
 
 
 

1969 films
1960s adventure comedy films
1969 musical comedy films
American adventure comedy films
American musical comedy films
Underwater civilizations in fiction
1960s English-language films
Films directed by Jack Arnold
Paramount Pictures films
1960s American films